Solar Fire is the fourth studio album by Manfred Mann's Earth Band, released in 1973. It spent 15 weeks on the Billboard 200 charts, peaking at number 96 on May 11, 1974. It was initially intended to be a full adaptation of The Planets Suite but Gustav Holst's heir, who had previously given permission to the adaptation of "Jupiter, the Bringer of Jollity" in the hit single "Joybringer", didn't allow this to happen, so the band made their own "cosmic" album using mostly original themes, although the most well known song is the (greatly reworked) Bob Dylan composition "Father of Day, Father of Night", which is in the Earth Band's live set to this day and remains a popular song on rock radio. "Pluto the Dog" (a play on the Disney character) and the two-part "Saturn, Lord of the Ring/Mercury, the Winged Messenger" are instrumentals, and "Earth the Circle Part 2" features only two lines of sung vocals. The album is often considered the peak of the early Earth Band line-up and, for a lot of progressive rock reviewers, the pinnacle of Mann's career in general.

Track listing
Side one
"Father of Day, Father of Night" (Bob Dylan) – 9:55
"In the Beginning, Darkness" (Manfred Mann, Mick Rogers, Chris Slade) – 5:22
"Pluto the Dog" (Mann, Rogers, Slade, Colin Pattenden) – 2:48
Side two
"Solar Fire" (Mann, Rogers, Slade, Pattenden) – 5:15
"Saturn, Lord of the Ring/Mercury, The Winged Messenger" (Mann/Mann, Rogers) – 6:31 
"Earth, The Circle Part 2" (Mann) – 3:23   
"Earth, The Circle Part 1" (Debussy/Mann) – 3:56

Bonus Tracks (1998 re-issue)   
 "Joybringer" (Gustav Holst, Mann, Rogers, Slade) – 3:25  (based on "make your stash" by Ross Wilson).
"Father of Day, Father of Night" (Edited version) (Dylan) – 3:03

The track listing varied from area to area. The US edition omitted the final track "Earth, the Circle Part 1" but included "Joybringer" before "Earth, the Circle Part 2".
"Joybringer" had been released as a non-album single in 1973.

Personnel

The Earth Band
 Manfred Mann – organ, Mellotron, Minimoog synthesiser, vocals on "Earth, the Circle Part 1"
 Mick Rogers – guitar, vocals
 Colin Pattenden – bass guitar
 Chris Slade – drums

Additional musicians
 Irene Chanter – backing vocals
 Doreen Chanter – backing vocals
 Grove Singers – backing vocals
 Paul Rutherford – trombone
 Peter Miles – additional percussion on "In the Beginning, Darkness"

Technical
 Manfred Mann's Earth Band – producer
 John Pantry – engineer
 Dave Stephens, John Edwards – assistant engineers
 Laurence Latham – tape operator
 Fin Costello – design, photography

References

External links
 Manfred Mann's Earth Band - Solar Fire (1973) album releases & credits at Discogs
 Manfred Mann's Earth Band - Solar Fire (1973) album to be listened on Spotify

Manfred Mann's Earth Band albums
1973 albums
Bronze Records albums
Polydor Records albums
Concept albums